Somorjai (Somorjay) is a Hungarian surname:
 Gábor A. Somorjai (born 1935, in Budapest), professor at the University of California, Berkeley
 Tamás Somorjai (born 1980), Hungarian football player
 Enikő Somorjai (born 1981), Hungarian ballet soloist dancer

Hungarian-language surnames
Toponymic surnames